Casey McKinnon is a Canadian actress and producer from Montreal, Quebec, Canada. She is known for her work on web series Galacticast, A Comicbook Orange and Kitkast.

Background
Born and raised in Montreal, McKinnon attended St. Thomas High School with partner Rudy Jahchan and studied East Asian studies at McGill University alongside royal friend Autumn Phillips; herself both  a McGill and St Thomas High School alumna. Before pursuing a full-time career in new media, she worked for the United Nations.

Career

Web series

McKinnon first became known under the pseudonym Ms. Kitka, the host of sex news and entertainment show Kitkast, launched on October 15, 2005. Inspired by podcasting and British television show Sin Cities, the show gained mainstream attention from Rolling Stone and The Guardian. However, due to a desire to make a science fiction show, she decided to move onto other projects and launched Galacticast with her boyfriend Rudy Jahchan on May 8, 2006. Under the corporation name 8Bit Brownies Inc., the two went on to co-produce a short miniseries for Next New Networks filmed at South by Southwest called Pulp Secret Confessions and later launched the comic book and graphic novel review show A Comicbook Orange on June 6, 2006, where McKinnon worked as host. In July 2007, McKinnon was hired to host Pulp Secret Live At Comic-Con, where she made a daily update show live from the San Diego Comic-Con,.

In addition to her self-produced works, she has appeared in Geek Therapy alongside America Young, Star Wars inspired lightsaber battle Elf Sabers with The Guild's Teal Sherer, Babelgum original series Hurtling Through Space at an Alarming Rate as nemesis Kalm, and the fan imagined trailer for Elfquest.

Journalism
From July to October 2007, she wrote a monthly column for The Guardian following her experiences working in web video. The articles connect new media to their Hollywood predecessors and reflect a desire for Internet television to be taken seriously by the old media community.

Filmography

Film

Television

Theatre

Web

Awards and nominations

As a producer, McKinnon's work on Galacticast garnered five PodTech Vloggie Awards and three Parsec nominations, while A Comicbook Orange was nominated for Best Hosted Web Series in the 2nd Streamy Awards and won Best Web Non-Fiction in Clicker.com's Best of 2010 awards.

She has also been named a sexy geek by the Montreal Gazette and blogger Violet Blue.

References

External links

1978 births
Actresses from Montreal
Anglophone Quebec people
Canadian film actresses
Canadian reporters and correspondents
Canadian television actresses
The Guardian journalists
Journalists from Montreal
Living people
McGill University alumni
Video bloggers
Canadian women bloggers
Writers from Montreal
21st-century Canadian women writers
Canadian bloggers
Women video bloggers